The Peconic River is a river within Suffolk County on Long Island, New York. The river is located in the eastern end of Long Island. The Peconic River drains an area between the Harbor Hill Moraine and flows into Flanders Bay, which in turn connects to Peconic Bay east of Riverhead.

The river originates in bogs and wetlands in central Long Island near the Brookhaven National Laboratory and flows eastward to the Peconic Bay. It is the longest river on Long Island and is almost entirely within the Central Long Island Pine Barrens which was set up in 1993 to protect its relative wilderness standing.

It is fresh water until about the center of Riverhead where it becomes an estuary.

The river is slow-moving, making it ideal for canoeing and kayaking.

It forms the border between Brookhaven and Riverhead towns as well as the border between Riverhead and Southampton.

List of crossings of the Peconic River

See also
List of New York rivers

References

External links
 Paddling the Peconic River
 Peconic River information

Rivers of Suffolk County, New York
Rivers of New York (state)
Brookhaven, New York
Riverhead (town), New York
Southampton (town), New York